Sam Anning is an Australian jazz bassist. He was nominated for ARIA Awards for Best Jazz Album with Dale Barlow, George Coleman Jr, Mark Fitzgibbon & Sam Anning - Treat Me Gently in 2009 and with Allan Browne, Marc Hannaford, Sam Anning - Shreveport Stomp in 2011.

Discography

Awards and nominations

AIR Awards
The Australian Independent Record Awards (commonly known informally as AIR Awards) is an annual awards night to recognise, promote and celebrate the success of Australia's Independent Music sector.

|-
| AIR Awards of 2011
|Shreveport Stomp
| Best Independent Jazz Album
| 
|-
| AIR Awards of 2022
| Oaatchapai
| Best Independent Jazz Album or EP
|

ARIA Music Awards
The ARIA Music Awards is an annual awards ceremony that recognises excellence, innovation, and achievement across all genres of Australian music. 

! 
|-
| 2009
|Treat Me Gently
| ARIA Award for Best Jazz Album
| 
| rowspan="2"| 
|-
| 2011
|Shreveport Stomp
| ARIA Award for Best Jazz Album
| 
|-
| 2022
| Oaatchapai
| Best Jazz Album
| 
|

Australian Music Prize
The Australian Music Prize (the AMP) is an annual award of $30,000 given to an Australian band or solo artist in recognition of the merit of an album released during the year of award. The commenced in 2005.

|-
| 2018
| Across A Field As Vast As One
| Australian Music Prize
| 
|-

Music Victoria Awards
The Music Victoria Awards are an annual awards night celebrating Victorian music. They commenced in 2006.

! 
|-
| 2018
| Across a Field as Vast as One (as Sam Anning Sextet)
| Best Jazz Album
| 
| 
|-
| 2022
| Sam Anning
| Best Jazz Work
| 
| 
|-

References

External links
Official website

Australian musicians
Living people
Year of birth missing (living people)